The Swadesh list is a classic compilation of tentatively universal concepts for the purposes of lexicostatistics. Translations of the Swadesh list into a set of languages allow researchers to quantify the interrelatedness of those languages. The Swadesh list is named after linguist Morris Swadesh. It is used in lexicostatistics (the quantitative assessment of the genealogical relatedness of languages) and glottochronology (the dating of language divergence). Because there are several different lists, some authors also refer to "Swadesh lists".

Versions and authors 
Morris Swadesh himself created several versions of his list. He started with a list of 215 meanings (falsely introduced as a list of 225 meanings in the paper due to a spelling error), which he reduced to 165 words for the Salish-Spokane-Kalispel language. In 1952, he published a list of 215 meanings, of which he suggested the removal of 16 for being unclear or not universal, with one added to arrive at 200 words. Even the new list has defects, but they are relatively mild and few in number." After minor corrections, the final 100-word list was published posthumously in 1971 and 1972.

Other versions of lexicostatistical test lists were published e.g. by Robert Lees (1953), John A. Rea (1958:145f), Dell Hymes (1960:6), E. Cross (1964 with 241 concepts), W. J. Samarin (1967:220f), D. Wilson (1969 with 57 meanings), Lionel Bender (1969), R. L. Oswald (1971), Winfred P. Lehmann (1984:35f), D. Ringe (1992, passim, different versions), Sergei Starostin (1984, passim, different versions), William S-Y. Wang (1994), M. Lohr (2000, 128 meanings in 18 languages). B. Kessler (2002), and many others. The Concepticon, a project hosted at the Cross-Linguistic Linked Data (CLLD) project, collects various concept lists (including classical Swadesh lists) across different linguistic areas and times, currently listing 240 different concept lists.

Frequently used and widely available on the internet, is the version by Isidore Dyen (1992, 200 meanings of 95 language variants). Since 2010, a team around Michael Dunn has tried to update and enhance that list.

Principle 
In origin, the words in the Swadesh lists were chosen for their universal, culturally independent availability in as many languages as possible, regardless of their "stability". Nevertheless, the stability of the resulting list of "universal" vocabulary under language change and the potential use of this fact for purposes of glottochronology have been  analyzed by numerous authors, including Marisa Lohr 1999, 2000.

The Swadesh list was put together by Morris Swadesh on the basis of his intuition. Similar more recent lists, such as the Dolgopolsky list (1964) or the Leipzig–Jakarta list (2009), are based on systematic data from many different languages, but they are not yet as widely known nor as widely used as the Swadesh list.

Usage in lexicostatistics and glottochronology 
Lexicostatistical test lists are used in lexicostatistics to define subgroupings of languages, and in glottochronology to "provide dates for branching points in the tree". The task of defining (and counting the number) of cognate words in the list is far from trivial, and often is subject to dispute, because cognates do not necessarily look similar, and recognition of cognates presupposes knowledge of the sound laws of the respective languages.

Swadesh 100 original final list
Swadesh's final list, published in 1971, contains 100 terms. Explanations of the terms can be found in Swadesh 1952 or, where noted by a dagger (†), in Swadesh 1955. Note that only this original sequence clarifies the correct meaning which is lost in an alphabetical order, e.g., in the case "27. bark" (originally without the specification here added).

 "Claw" was only added in 1955, but again replaced by many well-known specialists with (finger)nail, because expressions for "claw" are not available in many old, extinct, or lesser known languages.

The 110-item Global Lexicostatistical Database list uses the original 100-item Swadesh list, in addition to 10 other words from the Swadesh–Yakhontov list.

Swadesh 207 list
The most used list nowadays is the Swadesh 207-word list, adapted from Swadesh 1952.

In Wiktionary ("Swadesh lists by language"), Panlex and in Palisto's "Swadesh Word List of Indo-European languages", hundreds of Swadesh lists in this form can be found.

Shorter lists
The Swadesh–Yakhontov list is a 35-word subset of the Swadesh list posited as especially stable by Russian linguist Sergei Yakhontov around the 1960s, although the list was only officially published in 1991. It has been used in lexicostatistics by linguists such as Sergei Starostin. With their Swadesh numbers, they are:

Holman et al. (2008) found that in identifying the relationships between Chinese dialects the Swadesh–Yakhontov list was less accurate than the original Swadesh-100 list. Further they found that a different (40-word) list (also known as the ASJP list) was just as accurate as the Swadesh-100 list. However, they calculated the relative stability of the words by comparing retentions between languages in established language families. They found no statistically significant difference in the correlations in the families of the Old versus the New World.

The ranked Swadesh-100 list, with Swadesh numbers and relative stability, is as follows (Holman et al., Appendix. Asterisked words appear on the 40-word list):

Sign languages
In studying the sign languages of Vietnam and Thailand, linguist James Woodward noted that the traditional Swadesh list applied to spoken languages was unsuited for sign languages. The Swadesh list results in overestimation of the relationships between sign languages, due to indexical signs such as pronouns and parts of the body. The modified list is as follows, in largely alphabetical order:

See also

 Other lists
 A General Service List of English Words — roughly 2,000 of the most common English words
 Dolgopolsky list — the 15 words that change least as languages evolve
 Leipzig–Jakarta list — 100 words resistant to borrowing, used to estimate chronological separation of languages, intended to improve on the Swadesh list
 The Appendix of Swadesh lists in Wiktionary
 Projects and databases
 Automated Similarity Judgment Program — a project applying computational approaches to comparative linguistics using a database of word lists
 Evolution of Human Languages — a project to provide a genealogical classification of the world's languages
 Intercontinental Dictionary Series — a database of vocabulary lists in over 200 languages, especially indigenous South American and Northeast Caucasian
 Linguistic concepts and fields
 Cognate — a word derived from the same word as another
 Historical linguistics — the study of language change over time
 Indo-European studies — the study of Indo-European languages and their hypothetical common ancestor, Proto-Indo-European 
 Proto-language — a postulated ancestral language from which a family of languages is presumed to have evolved
 Methods of language reconstruction
 Comparative method — feature-by-feature comparison of related languages to reconstruct their development and common ancestor
 Mass lexical comparison — a controversial method, seen as a rival to the comparative method, to determine the relatedness of languages
 Internal reconstruction — reconstruction of an earlier state of a language without comparing it to other languages
 Other
 Basic English — a simplified form of English for communication and learning

Notes

References

 Campbell, Lyle. (1998). Historical Linguistics: An Introduction. Edinburgh: Edinburgh University Press. .
Embleton, Sheila (1995). Review of An Indo-European Classification: A Lexicostatistical Experiment by Isidore Dyen, J.B. Kruskal and P.Black. TAPS Monograph 82–5, Philadelphia. in Diachronica Vol. 12, no. 2, 263–68.
 Gudschinsky, Sarah. (1956). "The ABCs of Lexicostatistics (Glottochronology)." Word, Vol. 12, 175–210.
 Hoijer, Harry. (1956). "Lexicostatistics: A Critique." Language, Vol. 32, 49–60.
 Holm, Hans J. (2007). "The New Arboretum of Indo-European 'Trees': Can New Algorithms Reveal the Phylogeny and Even Prehistory of Indo-European?" Journal of Quantitative Linguistics, Vol. 14, 167–214.
Holman, Eric W., Søren Wichmann, Cecil H. Brown, Viveka Velupillai, André Müller, Dik Bakker (2008). "Explorations in Automated Language Classification". Folia Linguistica, Vol. 42, no. 2, 331–354
Sankoff, David (1970). "On the Rate of Replacement of Word-Meaning Relationships." Language, Vol. 46, 564–569.
Starostin, Sergei (1991). Altajskaja Problema i Proisxozhdenie Japonskogo Jazyka [The Altaic Problem and the Origin of the Japanese Language]. Moscow: Nauka
 Swadesh, Morris. (1950). "Salish Internal Relationships." International Journal of American Linguistics, Vol. 16, 157–167.
 Swadesh, Morris. (1952). "Lexicostatistic Dating of Prehistoric Ethnic Contacts." Proceedings of the American Philosophical Society, Vol. 96, 452–463.
 Swadesh, Morris. (1955). "Towards Greater Accuracy in Lexicostatistic Dating." International Journal of American Linguistics, Vol. 21, 121–137.
 Swadesh, Morris. (1971). The Origin and Diversification of Language. Ed. post mortem by Joel Sherzer. Chicago: Aldine. . Contains final 100-word list on p. 283. 
 Swadesh, Morris, et al. (1972). "What is Glottochronology?" in Morris Swadesh and Joel Sherzer, ed., The Origin and Diversification of Language, pp. 271–284. London: Routledge & Kegan Paul. .
Wittmann, Henri (1973). "The Lexicostatistical Classification of the French-Based Creole Languages." Lexicostatistics in Genetic Linguistics: Proceedings of the Yale Conference, April 3–4, 1971, dir. Isidore Dyen, 89–99. La Haye: Mouton.

External links

 Lexico-semantic universals: A critical overview
 Rosetta project
 Swadesh Lists of Brazilian Native Languages
 Illustrated linguistic and etymology blog by Stephan Steinbach

Historical linguistics
Comparative linguistics
Quantitative linguistics
Word lists
Linguistics lists
 
1950 documents